Akula (meaning shark) was a submarine built for the Imperial Russian Navy. Akula saw service during World War I and sank in November 1915 after hitting a naval mine.

Design and construction
The boat was designed by Ivan Bubnov and was an amalgam of the previous  and the  designs. The design was presented to the Marine technical committee in late 1905 and was ordered in 1906.

Akula was built at the Baltic shipyard in Saint Petersburg. The vessel was launched on 4 September 1907.

Service history 

Initially the boat was to use petrol engines but these were replaced by safer diesels. The boat's design was a single hull/ saddle tank type with a diving depth of 25 fathoms.

Significant initial problems were experienced and the electric motor and propellers which needed to be replaced. Akula was the first Russian submarine able to cruise long distances. In 1912 Akula made the world's first multi-torpedo volley with five torpedoes.

She subsequently served in the Baltic Fleet during World War I making 16 patrols and unsuccessfully attacked the German coastal defense ship .

On 10 October 1914, Akula ran aground in the Soeloesund. She was refloated with assistance from the gunboat . She struck a mine and sank near Hiiumaa in November 1915 on her 17th patrol. All 35 members of the crew died.

Notes

References

External links

 flot.com // page in Russian Language
 deepstorm.ru // in Russian Language.
 Shark Sub discovered beneath Baltic Sea

Submarines of the Imperial Russian Navy
Ships built at the Baltic Shipyard
1907 ships
World War I submarines of Russia
Ships sunk by mines
Ships lost with all hands
Maritime incidents in October 1914
Maritime incidents in November 1914